Pluto is the debut studio album by American rapper Future. It was released on April 17, 2012, through A1 Recordings and Freebandz, and distributed by Epic Records. The album features guest appearances from Drake, R. Kelly, T.I., Trae tha Truth and Snoop Dogg, with the production, which was handled by Will-A-Fool, Sonny Digital and K.E. on the Track, among others.

Pluto was supported by five singles: "Tony Montana", "Go Harder", "Magic (Remix)", "Same Damn Time" and "Turn On the Lights". The album received generally positive reviews from critics, debuting at number eight on the US Billboard 200, selling 41,000 copies in its first week. It was reissued with an alternate track list in 2012 as Pluto 3D.

Promotion 
The lead single from the album, "Tony Montana", was released on April 16, 2011. The record version of the song, which features a guest appearance from Canadian rapper Drake, was released on July 6, 2011. The music video for "Tony Montana" was released on October 27, 2011. The song peaked at number four on the US Bubbling Under Hot 100 Singles.

"Go Harder" was released digitally as the album's second single on November 29, 2011, and impacted rhythmic contemporary radio on January 10, 2012.

"Magic (Remix)" featuring T.I., was released as the album's third single on January 23, 2012. The music video for "Magic (Remix)" was released on January 31, 2012. The song peaked at number 69 on the US Billboard Hot 100.

The album's fourth single, "Same Damn Time", was released on March 24, 2012. The music video was released on April 6, 2012. The remix to "Same Damn Time", which features guest appearances from Diddy and Ludacris, was released on May 16, 2012. The music video for "Same Damn Time (Remix)" was released on July 22, 2012. The song peaked at number 92 on the Billboard Hot 100.

The album's fifth single, "Turn On the Lights", was released on April 13, 2012. The song peaked at number 50 on the Billboard Hot 100, making it the album's most successful single to date. In 2012, it was announced that Future scored the number one spot on the Mediabase Urban Mainstream chart for his Mike Will-produced single, "Turn On the Lights". It became his most successful song on the latter three charts, and his most successful single as a lead artist. In 2012, Future released the remix to "Turn On the Lights" featuring Lil Wayne.

Critical reception 

Pluto was met with generally positive reviews. At Metacritic, which assigns a normalized rating out of 100 to reviews from mainstream publications, the album received an average score of 68, based on 10 reviews.

David Jeffries of AllMusic called it "fat and redundant at 15 tracks, but it delivers whenever you desire that purple and woozy, Cudi-meets-Khalifa flavor", and wrote that "Future comes off as a memorable name in spite of his narrow style". Pitchforks Jordan Sargent wrote that, "though it will sound instantly recognizable, his personality, voice, and skewed take on pop-rap make it instantly different". Andrew Nosnitsky of Spin called its songs "so well-defined" with "more advanced experiments" than Future's previous mixtapes and stated, "The more adventurous listener might wonder what he could accomplish if he broke free of his genre's gravitational pull entirely".

In a mixed review, Alex Macpherson of Fact found the album too conventional, calling it "template rap", and stated, "Both Future's drugged-out vocal style and the chintzy production, so arresting in isolation, become wearying". Evan Rytlewski of The A.V. Club called Pluto a "sporadically engrossing, frequently frustrating curiosity" and commented that it "is a more compelling listen than an album with so many atrocious lyrical turns has any right to be". In his consumer guide, critic Robert Christgau gave the album a two-star honorable mention, he cited "Turn On the Lights" and "Permanent Scar" as highlights and quipped, "The truth is, his Auto-Tuned flow has more future in it than his intermittently interplanetary rhymes". Joshua Errett of Now said, "Pluto nicely refreshes current rap trends and offers some genuinely forward-thinking hooks". Calvin Stovall of XXL said, "Pluto may be far from the sun, but Future shines brightest when he aligns with the stars".

Rankings 
Chris Richards of The Washington Post placed the album at number four on his list of the top-10 albums of 2012. The New York Times Jon Caramanica included the album in his top-10 albums list, ranking it at number nine. Jody Rosen of Slate placed the album at number one on his top-20 albums list for 2012. Spin ranked the album number 11 on its list of 50 Best Albums of 2012. The album was listed 34th on Stereogums list of top 50 albums of 2012 and subsequently listed 100th on their list of top 100 albums of the 2010s. Consequence ranked the album number 36 on its list of top-50 albums of the year. Pitchfork placed the album at number 37 on its list of 50 Best Albums of 2012.

Commercial performance 
Pluto debuted at number eight on the US Billboard 200, with first-week sales of 41,000 copies. As of December 2012, the album had sold 217,000 copies in the United States. In 2022, the album was certified platinum by the Recording Industry Association of America (RIAA) for combined sales and album-equivalent units of 1,000,000 units in the United States.

Track listing 

Notes
  signifies a co-producer

Personnel
Credits for Pluto adapted from liner notes.

 Big Rube – spoken word, featured artist
 John Blu – producer
 Jon Boi – producer
 Will-A-Fool – producer
 Tom Coyne – mastering
 Crazy Mike – mixing
 Honorable C.N.O.T.E. – producer
 Sonny Digital – producer
 DJ Spinz – producer
 Drake – featured artist
 K.E. on the Track – producer
 Steve Fisher – engineer, mixing
 Future – primary artist, producer
 Jordan J. Sirhan – engineer
 Trehy Harris – assistant
 Jaycen Joshua – mixing

 JP Robinson – art direction
 Juicy J – featured artist, producer
 R. Kelly – featured artist
 Ross Kossman – assistant
 Mike Will Made It – producer
 Nard & B – producer
 Michael Patterson – guitar
 P-Nasty – producer
 Propane – engineer
 Will Ragland – design
 Ray Seay – mixing
 Snoop Dogg – featured artist
 Brian "B-Luv" Thomas – engineer
 Pharris Thomas – producer
 Trae tha Truth – featured artist

Charts

Weekly charts

Year-end charts

Certifications

Release history

References

2012 debut albums
Epic Records albums
Albums produced by Honorable C.N.O.T.E.
Albums produced by Organized Noize
Albums produced by Mike Will Made It
Albums produced by Juicy J
Future (rapper) albums
Albums produced by Nard & B
Albums produced by Sonny Digital